Marcos Renan Oliveira Santana, (born 7 April 1990) also called Renan (ヘナン), is a football midfielder for Fukushima United FC.

Club statistics
Updated to 23 February 2017.

References

External links
 

 ogol 
Profile at Fukushima United FC

1990 births
Living people
Brazilian footballers
Brazilian expatriate footballers
Expatriate footballers in Japan
J2 League players
J3 League players
Hokkaido Consadole Sapporo players
Fukushima United FC players
Grêmio Barueri Futebol players
Association football midfielders